Joshua Allderman (born ) is a South African rugby union player for the Eastern Province Elephants in the Currie Cup. His regular position is scrum-half.

Allderman was born in Cape Town, finished his schooling at Selborne College in East London, where he also played first team rugby and earned a call-up to the  Under-18 Academy Week squad in 2014 and Craven Week squad in 2015.

Allderman moved to Pretoria to join the  academy and represented them at youth level from 2016 to 2018.

He was named on the bench for their season-opener against , but failed to make an appearance.

References

South African rugby union players
Living people
1997 births
Rugby union players from Cape Town
Rugby union scrum-halves
Southern Kings players
Blue Bulls players
Eastern Province Elephants players